Francesco Scuderi (born 4 October 1977) is an Italian sprinter who specialized in the 100 metres.

Biography
He finished seventh in 4 x 100 metres relay at the 2000 Olympic Games, together with teammates Francesco Scuderi, Alessandro Cavallaro, Maurizio Checcucci and Andrea Colombo. He also won the bronze medal at the 1996 World Junior Championships and finished fifth at the 2002 European Indoor Championships, both in the individual distance. At the 2001 Mediterranean Games he won a gold medal in relay. He also competed at the 2001 World Championships and the 2002 European Championships without reaching the final.

His personal best times were 6.60 seconds in the 60 metres, achieved in the heats of the 1998 European Indoor Championships in Valencia; 10.19 seconds in the 100 metres, achieved in September 2000 in Milan; and 20.66 seconds in the 200 metres, achieved in June 2006 in Palermo.

He contracted Bechet Syndrome in 2003 and could not compete for two years due to the seriousness of the condition. He recovered and managed to gain selection for the 2006 European Athletics Indoor Cup.

Olympic results

National titles
He won 8 national championships at individual senior level.
Italian Athletics Championships
100 metres: 1998, 2000, 2001, 2002, 2003
Italian Indoor Athletics Championships
60 metres: 1998, 2001, 2002, 2006

See also
 Italian all-time lists - 100 metres
 Italy national relay team

References

External links
 

1977 births
Living people
Italian male sprinters
Athletes (track and field) at the 2000 Summer Olympics
Olympic athletes of Italy
Athletics competitors of Fiamme Azzurre
Mediterranean Games gold medalists for Italy
Athletes (track and field) at the 2001 Mediterranean Games
World Athletics Championships athletes for Italy
Mediterranean Games medalists in athletics
Italian Athletics Championships winners
Sportspeople from Catania